Adrien-Mehdi Monfray (born 20 December 1990) is a French professional footballer who plays for Grenoble Foot 38 as a defender.

Personal life
Born in France, Monfray is of Algerian descent.

Career statistics

References

External links
 
 Adrien Monfray profile at foot-national.com

1990 births
Living people
Footballers from Nice
Association football defenders
French footballers
French sportspeople of Algerian descent
Ligue 2 players
Championnat National players
Championnat National 3 players
CA Bastia players
Stade Lavallois players
USC Corte players
US Orléans players
Grenoble Foot 38 players